Paraccra is a genus of moths belonging to the family Tortricidae.

Species
Paraccra chorogiae Razowski, 2012
Paraccra mimesa Razowski, 2005

See also
List of Tortricidae genera

References

 , 2005: Notes and descriptions of primitive Tortricini from Tropical Africa, with a list of Asian taxa (Lepidoptera: Tortricidae). Shilap Revista de Lepidopterologia 33 (132): 423–436. Full article:.
 , 2012: Tortricidae (Lepidoptera) from the Tervuren Museum: 1. Tortricini and Chlidanotini. Polish Journal of Entomology 81 (2): 129–143. Abstract and full article:

External links
tortricidae.com

Tortricini
Tortricidae genera